The New York Tech Bears refer to the mascot and sports teams of the New York Institute of Technology (NYIT), located in Old Westbury, New York, United States. All of New York Tech's teams compete in NCAA Division II. The Bears are part of the East Coast Conference (ECC). Tech is best known for its men's lacrosse team, which has won four NCAA Division II national championships. Tech also sent several runners to the Olympic Games, in 1980, 1988, 1992, and in 2000. As of August 2020, NYIT has its intercollegiate NCAA D-II athletics activities currently suspended for at least two years, and will be expected to return to active competition by the 2022–23 academic year.

Current sports programs

 Men's programs
 Baseball
 Basketball
 Cross country
 Lacrosse
 Soccer
 Track & field
 Women's programs
 Basketball
 Cross country
 Soccer
 Softball
 Lacrosse
 Track & field

Facilities
President's Stadium: A 1,000-seat stadium that is the home of the men's and women's lacrosse teams and men's and women's soccer teams. In 2006, the NYIT replaced the natural grass of the field with FieldTurf.

Angelo Lorenzo Memorial Field: The home of the Tech baseball program. The field was resurfaced in the 2012–2013 academic year, with raised dugouts, a new press box behind home plate and will FieldTurf both the infield and outfield.

Recreation Hall: A 500-seat arena, Recreation Hall is home to men's and women's basketball and features a new hardwood floor installed in 2019.

Tech Softball Complex: The home of the Tech softball team.

Achievements

Baseball
Led by Bob Hirschfield until 2012, the NYIT baseball team was the only sport that competed at the NCAA Division I level, as an independent. With over 650 wins, Coach Hirschfield helped over 60 players reach the next level and sign professional contracts. The most recent signings were Joe Esposito, Mike Laluna, Kraig Binick, Mike Roth, Lou Bernardi, Jon Burke, Andrew Gurassi, Steve Faulkner, George Carroll, Danny Lackner and Frank Valentino. Some of the more notable professional signings in recent and past years were Al Watson, Al Labozetta, Bill DaCosta, Alan Ashkinazy, Mike Gaffney, Chris Rojas, Brian Goelz, and Jimmy Goelz.

The Bears opened their newly renovated ball park in 2014 and also began playing as an independent, following the demise of the Great West Conference

In the fall of 2017, Tech moved its baseball program to Division II, matching the rest of its athletic programs. The school requested that the NCAA grant the team immediate eligibility rather than going through the usual two-year transition period, and this was granted, allowing the team to immediately compete in the East Coast Conference and able to qualify for the NCAA Division II championship.

Under first-year coach Frank Catalanotto in 2019, the program reached the College World Series for the first time in program history.

Lacrosse

During lacrosse coach Jack Kaley's tenure (1993-2009), Tech's lacrosse team rose to become a national powerhouse. Under Kaley, the Bears had a record of 152–28. They won the East Coast Conference championship four consecutive years (2002-2005). They have reached the NCAA Division II national championship game six times, and have won the national championship four times, including an undefeated season in 2003. Upon Kaley's retirement, Bill Dunn was appointed head coach. Since Bill Dunn has been appointed head coach, the Bears have won the East Coast Conference Championships in 2017 and 2018.

NCAA National Finalists: 1994, 1997, 2002, 2003, 2005, 2008
NCAA National Championships: 1997, 2003, 2005, 2008

Men's basketball
In 1980, the men's basketball team made its first and only appearance in the NCAA Division II national championship game, losing 80–74 to Virginia Union. Several Bears have gone on to play professionally overseas including Bryant Lassiter, Manix Auriantal, and Kirk Stewart. After serving as interim head coach for the final two games of the 2018–19 season, Evan Conti became head coach for the 2019–20 season.

 NCAA Tournament Appearances: 1978, 1980, 2004
 ECC Championship: 2006-2007

Women's basketball
In 2005–2006, the women's basketball team made its first appearance in the East Coast Conference tournament. The Bears advanced to the championship game. NYIT made another run at the ECC title in 2006–07. In 2009–2010, Anthony Crocitto was named head coach of the women's basketball program and since then the Bears have doubled their wins total each season. In 2011–2012, NYIT produced the program's best record in school history (16-13). The Bears made it back to the ECC Tournament but lost in the first round to neighboring LIU Post. In the 2014–15 season, the Bears lost in the ECC Championship to Queens College (N.Y.). Under third-year coach Kenny Parham, the program won its first East Coast Conference postseason championship in 2019.

Men's soccer
Since coach Carlos Delcid took over in 2001, NYIT's soccer team has become one of the best in the nation. In 2003, the Bears advanced to the NCAA playoffs after an absence of 18 years, when the Bears advanced to the NCAA Final Four in 1985. They have established a school record of 13 wins in a row and have been ranked as high as no. 7 in the nation. In 2005, the men's soccer team advanced to the NCAA Division II Elite Eight. They lost on penalty kicks to Franklin Pierce College. The Bears won their first ECC Championship in 2011 off a goal from Senior Danilo Hernandez. NYIT men's soccer has four All-Americans: Vinny Caccavale (2012), Kyle Cupid (2007), Eduardo Anacelto (2005), and Algernon Lawrence (1984).

Softball
The softball team made its first appearance in the NCAA tournament in 2009.

Notable alumni
 Don Cooper: Baseball (Pitching Coach, Chicago White Sox, Member of 2005 World Series Championship team)
 Ray Giannelli: Baseball
 Allen Watson: Baseball (Member of 2000 World Series Champion New York Yankees)

References

External links